Eliasberg is a Jewish and Yiddish surname. It may refer to:

Karl Eliasberg (1907–1978), Belarusian-Russian conductor and violinist
Judah Bezalel Eliasberg (1800–1847), Russian Hebrew writer and translator
Louis E. Eliasberg (1896–1976), American financier and numismatist
Jan Eliasberg (born 1954), American film, theatre, and television director, writer, and producer

Jewish surnames
Yiddish-language surnames